The 21st South American Junior Championships in Athletics were held in Montevideo, Uruguay from June 16th –19th, 1989.

Participation (unofficial)
Detailed result lists can be found on the "World Junior Athletics History" website.  An unofficial count yields the number of about 248 athletes from about 10 countries:  Argentina (52), Bolivia (4), Brazil (59), Chile (30), Colombia (5), Ecuador (10), Paraguay (27), Peru (6), Uruguay (32), Venezuela (23).

Medal summary
Medal winners are published for men and women
Complete results can be found on the "World Junior Athletics History" website.

Men

Women

Medal table (unofficial)

References

External links
World Junior Athletics History

South American U20 Championships in Athletics
South American Junior Championships in Athletics
South American Junior Championships in Athletics
International athletics competitions hosted by Uruguay
South American Junior Championships in Athletics